Delaney Williams (born December 12, 1962) is an American character actor from Washington, D.C. He appeared on the HBO drama The Wire (2002–2008) as a recurring guest star playing homicide sergeant Jay Landsman. He also had a small role on HBO's mini-series The Corner (2000) which brought him to the attention of the producers who worked on The Corner prior to casting The Wire. He has also made appearances on such shows as Law & Order: Special Victims Unit, Law & Order: Criminal Intent, Veep, Cold Case and The Punisher.

Filmography

Film

References

External links
 
 Delaney Williams on Twitter
 Delaney Williams Facebook Page
 Delaney Williams on Instagram

1962 births
Living people
20th-century American male actors
21st-century American male actors
American male film actors
American male television actors
Male actors from Washington, D.C.